Reading Township may refer to:

 Reading Township, Livingston County, Illinois
 Reading Township, Calhoun County, Iowa
 Reading Township, Sioux County, Iowa, in Sioux County, Iowa
 Reading Township, Lyon County, Kansas, in Lyon County, Kansas
 Reading Township, Hillsdale County, Michigan
 Reading Township, Butler County, Nebraska
 Reading Township, Hamilton County, Ohio, a paper township formed by the city of Reading
 Reading Township, Perry County, Ohio
 Reading Township, Adams County, Pennsylvania

See also
 Redding Township (disambiguation)

Township name disambiguation pages

it:Reading (township)